Cardiac Hill may refer to:

 A hill in Atlanta along the course of the Peachtree Road Race
 A hill in Kerry, Ireland, along the trail to the Torc Waterfall
 A hill on the University of Pittsburgh campus adjacent to Lothrop Hall
 A hill in California's Auburn State Recreation Area
 A hill in Long Island NY’s cross country course Sunken Meadow